Munsusan (문수산) is the name of several mountains in Korea:
 Munsusan (North Gyeongsang), in Bonghwa, North Gyeongsang Province, 1207 metres
 Munsusan (South Jeolla/North Jeolla), in Jangseong, South Jeolla Province, and Gochang, North Jeolla Province, 621 metres
 Munsusan (Ulsan), in Ulju, Ulsan, 600 metres
 Munsusan (Gyeonggi), in Gimpo, Gyeonggi Province, 376 metres

See also 
 Munsubong (disambiguation)